Jules Asner (born Julie Ann White; February 14, 1968) is an American screenwriter, author, former entertainment journalist, television personality, and model.

Early life
Asner was born Julie Ann White in Tempe, Arizona. At the age of 16, she was discovered at a modeling convention in Scottsdale, Arizona. She began her career as an Elite model. She shared a bunk-room with Cindy Crawford during the early years of her modeling career. In 1986, she graduated from McClintock High School in Tempe.

She attended UCLA.

Career
Asner was a long-time E! personality. During her peak with the network, she hosted six hours of programming daily. Among the series she hosted were Revealed with Jules Asner, E! News Live and Wild On! as well as many live specials for the network. She received a Prism Award as well as a Gracie Award for her interview show Revealed with Jules Asner.

Before joining E! Asner was an entertainment reporter for Reuters Television Good Morning England, The Entertainment Show on Sky Television, and Extra. She hosted Live by Request on A&E and was a segment director and producer on Hard Copy.

Miramax Books purchased the publishing rights to her first novel, Whacked. The book was released June 3, 2008. Whacked was a top ten fiction bestseller on Amazon and was in its third printing within its first month of release.

Asner wrote the screenplay for husband Steven Soderbergh's film Logan Lucky. She chose to use the pseudonym Rebecca Blunt because she did not want the "story" surrounding the film to be that "Soderbergh was directing his wife's script." In 2018, a Twitter account belonging to TheRebeccaBlunt posted photos of Asner and Soderbergh behind the scenes working on Logan Lucky. Asner previously did uncredited rewrite work on Magic Mike and several of Soderbergh's other films.

Personal life 

From 1992 to 1996, she was married to Matthew Asner and took his surname, making her the daughter-in-law of actor Ed Asner.

She married film director Steven Soderbergh in their New York apartment on May 10, 2003. Soderbergh often credits his wife with influencing his female characters.

References

External links

 
 Jules Asner 2003 Interview on Sidewalks Entertainment

Entertainment journalists
American women screenwriters
American television personalities
Novelists from Arizona
Female models from Arizona
University of California, Los Angeles alumni
People from Tempe, Arizona
1968 births
Living people
21st-century American screenwriters
21st-century American novelists
21st-century American women writers
20th-century American journalists
American male journalists
21st-century American journalists
American women television journalists
Journalists from Arizona
Screenwriters from Arizona
20th-century American women